Stigmella zelleriella is a moth of the family Nepticulidae found in Europe and Russia. It was first described by Samuel Constantinus Snellen van Vollenhoven in 1875. The name zelleriella, honours the German microlepidopterist Philipp Christoph Zeller.

Description
Adults are on wing from April to September.

The larvae feed on Salix lapponum, Salix repens and Salix repens arenaria, mining the leaves of their host plant. The mine consists of a short gallery, often partly following the leaf margin, almost completely stuffed with frass. The corridor gradually widens into a blotch that can occupy up to half of a leaf. Pupation takes place outside of the mine.

Distribution
The moth is found from Fennoscandia and northern Russia to the Alps and from Ireland to central Russia. Some authors consider the form lappovimella to be a distinct species. It occurs in northern Fennoscandia.

References

External links

Swedish Moths
Stigmella zelleriella images at  Consortium for the Barcode of Life

Nepticulidae
Leaf miners
Moths described in 1875
Moths of Europe
Taxa named by Samuel Constantinus Snellen van Vollenhoven